New Pop Sunday is the third studio album by the American  rock band Sponge, released in 1999 through Beyond Records.

Production
Sponge recorded most of New Pop Sunday while they were still with Columbia Records. The label was not interested in releasing it however, so the band decided to finish the album themselves and released it through Beyond instead.

Critical reception
The Morning Call wrote that "New Pop Sunday includes a mix of subtle, catchy numbers. But there are a few brawny raveups, such as the potent 'Planet Girls' and the hook-laden 'Radio Prayer' [sic]." Trouser Press noted that "lacking Rotting Piñatas hooks and Wax Ecstatics grimy charm, New Pop Sunday is fairly forgettable." 

The Detroit Free Press deemed the album "refreshingly decent," writing that "rough-edged guitars are stretched wide, chiming guitars looped and echoed, vocals reverbed into liquid." The Journal Gazette declared: "Sponge is an imitation of an imitator; they are chronically infatuated with those Pearl Jam-pilferers Stone Temple Pilots." AllMusic wrote that the album "finds the band embracing their pop, hard rock, and arena rock roots, creating an old-fashioned hard rock platter that sounds completely out of step with the late '90s." and noted "In a way, that's refreshing".

Track listing

Band members
 Vinnie Dombroski - vocals
 Michael Cross - guitars/backing vocals
 Tim Cross - bass/backing vocals
 Joey Mazzola - guitars/backing vocals
 Charlie Grover - drums

Additional personnel
 Erik C. Casillas - art design
 Gary Malerba - photography
 The Left Bank Organization - management
 Gerald Margolis & Barry Mallen - legal affairs (Manatt, Phelps & Phillips)
 Bernie Gudvi - business management (Gudvi, Chapnick & Oppenheim)
 Brian Greenbaum - Booking agent (CAA)
 Steve Hall - mastering
 Rich Alvy, Andy Patalan & Mike Lutz - engineering assistants
 Randy Nicklaus - A&R

Additional musicians
 Horns on "Disconnected": Johnny R. Evans, Kenneth Robinson, John R. Paxton
 Rick Melick - keyboards on "Live Here Without You"

References

1999 albums
Sponge (band) albums